Relegem is a town and deelgemeente in the municipality of Asse in Flemish Brabant, Belgium. Relegem was its own municipality until January 1, 1977 when it was merged with Asse as part of the fusion of the Belgian municipalities.

Evolution of population

19th century

20th century until fusion with Asse

Famous inhabitants
Johan Boskamp

Former municipalities of Flemish Brabant